Altiphylax tokobajevi, also known commonly as the Kirghizia even-fingered gecko, the Tien Shan even-fingered gecko,  and the Tjan-Shan pygmy gecko, is a species of lizard in the family Gekkonidae. The species is native to Asia.

Etymology
The specific name, tokobajevi, is in honor of Marat M. Tokobaev (born 1932), who is an entomologist and parasitologist.

Geographic range
A. tokobajevi is found in Kyrgyzstan.

Habitat

Reproduction
A. tokobajevi is oviparous.

References

Further reading
Bauer AM, Masroor R, Titus-McQuillan J, Heinicke MP, Daza JD, Jackman TR (2013). "A preliminary phylogeny of the Palearctic naked-toed geckos (Reptilia: Squamata: Gekkonidae) with taxonomic implications". Zootaxa 3599 (4): 301–324.
Jeremčenko VK, Szczerbak NN (1984). "[New gecko lizard species (Reptilia, Gekkonidae) from Tien-Shan]". Vestnik Zoologii, Kiev 1984 (2): 46–50. (Alsophylax tokobajevi, new species). (in Russian).
Sindaco R, Jeremčenko VK (2008). The Reptiles of the Western Palearctic. 1. Annotated Checklist and Distributional Atlas of the Turtles, Crocodiles, Amphisbaenians and Lizards of Europe, North Africa, Middle East and Central Asia. (Monographs of the Societas Herpetologica Italica). Latina, Italy: Edizioni Belvedere. 580 pp. . (Altiphylax tokobajevi, new combination).

Altiphylax
Reptiles described in 1984